Warrant officer is an officer in a military organization who is designated by a warrant, as distinguished from a commissioned officer.

Warrant officer or Warrant Officer may also refer to:

 Warrant officer (United Kingdom), the highest non-commissioned rank in the British Armed Forces
 Warrant officer (United States), an officer above the senior-most enlisted ranks, as well as officer cadets and candidates, but below the officer grade
 Assistant warrant officer, a rank in Pakistan Air Force above Senior Technician and below Warrant Officer
 Canadian Forces Chief Warrant Officer, the senior non-commissioned member appointment in the Canadian Forces
 Chief of the Air Staff's Warrant Officer, the senior warrant officer of the Royal Air Force
 Chief warrant officer, the most senior Army and Air Force non-commissioned member (NCM) rank of the Canadian Forces
 First warrant officer, a Warrant Officer rank in the Singapore Armed Forces
 Master warrant officer, a military rank in the Canadian Forces and the Singapore Armed Forces
 SAFWOS Leadership School, a Singapore Armed Forces training school within the Pasir Laba Camp complex for warrant officers
 Second warrant officer, a Warrant Officer rank in the Singapore Armed Forces
 Senior warrant officer, a Warrant Officer rank in the Singapore Armed Forces
 Station Warrant Officer, the senior Warrant Officer on a British Royal Air Force station (base)
 Third warrant officer, a Warrant Officer rank in the Singapore Armed Forces
 Warrant Officer Basic Course, technical training a new US Army Warrant Officer receives after warrant officer candidate school
 Warrant Officer Candidate School (United States Army), the entry-level training for Warrant Officer Candidates in the United States Army
 Warrant Officer of the Navy, the most senior non commissioned officer rank in the Royal Australian Navy (RAN)

See also
 Warrant Officer 1 (disambiguation)
 Warrant (disambiguation)
 Office (disambiguation)
 Officer, a person who has a position of authority in a hierarchical organization